USS SC-742 was a United States Navy  which after service during World War II was transferred to the Philippine Navy in 1948.

Laid down on 22 April 1942 at Julius Petersen Inc., Nyack, New York and launched on 17 August 1942 and commissioned on 1 January 1943.

Transferred to the Pacific Fleet, she participated in the landings during the battle of Arawe and later the during the Philippines campaign. She was transferred to the Philippine Navy on 2 July 1948.

External links
USS SC-742

 

SC-497-class submarine chasers
Ships built in Nyack, New York
1942 ships
SC-497-class submarine chasers of the Philippine Navy
Ships transferred from the United States Navy to the Philippine Navy